Kemal Başkır (born 7 March 1952) is a Turkish weightlifter. He competed in the men's lightweight event at the 1976 Summer Olympics.

References

External links
 

1952 births
Living people
Turkish male weightlifters
Olympic weightlifters of Turkey
Weightlifters at the 1976 Summer Olympics
Sportspeople from Eskişehir
20th-century Turkish people
21st-century Turkish people